Nicolae Butacu (born 15 July 1974) is a retired freestyle and backstroke swimmer from Romania, who represented his native country at the 1996 Summer Olympics in Atlanta, Georgia. He is best known for winning two silver medals at the 1996 European SC Championships in Rostock.

References

External links
 

1974 births
Living people
Romanian male backstroke swimmers
Olympic swimmers of Romania
Swimmers at the 1996 Summer Olympics
Romanian male freestyle swimmers
Medalists at the FINA World Swimming Championships (25 m)
European Aquatics Championships medalists in swimming